Thymic cancer is a general term for a cancer of the thymus gland.

Thymic carcinoma
Thymoma

Lymphatic organ neoplasia
Thymus